Boyalıca can refer to the following places in Turkey:

 Boyalıca, Bursa, a town
 Boyalıca, Daday, a village
 Boyalıca, Dursunbey, a village